Argyresthia oreasella, the cherry shoot borer moth, is a moth of the family Yponomeutidae. It is found in North America, including New York, Michigan, Idaho, Missouri, Colorado, New Mexico, California, Quebec, Alberta and Saskatchewan.

The wingspan is 10–13 mm. The forewings are silvery white, with a pale golden brown streak at the base of the costa. The hindwings are dark gray. Adults are on wing from the end of June to mid August.

The larvae feed on Prunus virginiana, Prunus pensylvanica, Amelanchier alnifolia and possibly Quercus species. They mine the shoots of their host plant. Larvae leave the stem to pupate. Full-grown larvae are light green and reach a length of 7 mm. This species overwinters as an egg on leaf buds.

References

Moths described in 1877
Argyresthia
Moths of North America